B. Savaram is a village in Razole Mandal, Dr. B.R. Ambedkar Konaseema district in the state of Andhra Pradesh in India.

Geography 

Demographics 
 India census,B. Savaram had a population of 2609, out of which 1265 were male and 1344 were female. The population of children below 6 years of age was 10%. The literacy rate of the village was 85%.

References 

Villages in Razole mandal